The Canadian Screen Award for Best Writing in a Children's or Youth Program or Series is a Canadian Screen Award that honours writing in English language children's television produced in Canada.

Winners and nominees 
Winners in bold.

1990s

1994
  Roger Fredericks and Louise Moon - Street Cents ("Hype")
 Richard Mortimer - AIDScare/AIDsCare
 David Preston - Are You Afraid of the Dark? ("The Tale of the Dream Girl")
 Leila Basen - Ready or Not ("Am I Perverted or What?")
 S.M. Molitor, Don Arioli, and Morton Ritts - The Busy World of Richard Scarry ("The Talking Bread/Couscous/The Three Fisherman")

1995
  Roger Fredericks and Louise Moon - Street Cents ("Music")
 David Preston - Bonjour Timothy
 Steve Westren - Groundling Marsh ("Snow Job")
 David Finley - Jim Henson's Dog City ("Doggy See, Doggy Do")
 Frazer McArter - Madison ("Stealing Home")
 Michael Mercer - Nilus the Sandman: The First Day

1996
  Marlene Matthews - The Composer's Specials ("Handel's Last Chance")
 Scott Peters - Are You Afraid of the Dark? ("The Tale of Station 109.1")
 Billy Brown and Dan Angel - Goosebumps ("The Cuckoo Clock of Doom")
 Chris Haddock - Heck's Way Home
 Heather Conkie - My Mother's Ghost
 Sugith Varughese - On My Mind ("The Secret Life of Goldfish")

1997
  Susin Nielsen - The Adventures of Shirley Holmes ("The Case of the Burning Building")
 John Acorn - Acorn: The Nature Nut ("An Ol’ Anole or Two")
 Heather Conkie - Flash Forward ("Double Bill")
 Robert C. Cooper - Flash Forward ("Presents")
 Vicki Grant - Theodore Tugboat ("Hank’s Funny Feeling")

1998
  Raymond Storey - The Inventors' Specials ("Leonardo: A Dream of Flight")
 Edwina Follows - Ready or Not ("Your Own Money")
 Karen Walton - Straight Up ("Gravity")
 Heather Conkie - The Inventors' Specials ("Galileo: On the Shoulders of Giants")
 Marty Chan - The Orange Seed Myth and Other Lies Mothers Tell

1999
  Pete Sauder and Ian James Corlett - Rolie Polie Olie ("Roll the Camera")
 Dennis Foon - Jenny and the Queen of Light
 John Pellatt and Kenn Scott - Ned's Newt ("Back to the Futile")
 Victoria Grant - Scoop and Doozie ("Au Revoir Underpants")
 Louise Moon - Street Cents ("Fashion")

2000s

2000
  Victoria Grant - Scoop and Doozie ("What Rubbish!")
 John van Bruggen - Franklin ("Franklin and the Two Henrys")
 Robert Mills - Ruffus the Dog ("Troll Under the Bridge")
 Avrum Jacobson, Christel Kleitsch, and Phoebe Gilman - Something From Nothing
 Heather Conkie - The Artists' Specials ("Degas and the Dancer")

2001
  Gerard Lewis - Mentors ("Klondike Daze")
 Ian Weir - Edgemont ("The Liar's Club")
 Alex Pugsley - I Was A Sixth Grade Alien ("I am Larrabe Hicks!")
 Vito Viscomi - Yvon of the Yukon ("The Walrus Between Us")

2002
  Ali Marie Matheson and Jon Cooksey - The Santa Claus Brothers
 Bruce Kalish - Jett Jackson: The Movie
 Suzanne Bolch and John May - Our Hero ("The Comeback Issue")
 Sib Ventress - The Famous Jett Jackson ("Something in the Air")
 Matthew Salsberg - Big Wolf on Campus ("Being Tommy Dawkins")

2003
  Peter Lauterman - The Zack Files ("Zackeo & Juliet")
 Tassie Cameron and Jackie May - Fast Food High
 Conni Massing - Mentors ("The Tao of Hockey")
 Simon Racioppa and Richard Elliott - Moville Mysteries ("Big Toe, Big Evil")

2004
  Jason Hopley and Jamie Shannon - Nanalan' ("Free")
 Shelley Scarrow, James Hurst, and Nicole Demerse - Degrassi: The Next Generation ("Accidents Will Happen")
 Ian Weir - Edgemont ("You Gotta Have Friends")
 Jennifer Cowan - Edgemont ("Two Guys and a Baby")
 John Van Bruggen - Jacob Two-Two ("Jacob Two-Two and the Purloined Hockey Card")
 Robert C. Cooper - The Impossible Elephant

2005
  Derek Schreyer - 15/Love ("Renewal")
 Jana Sinyor and Heather Conkie - Dark Oracle ("Dark Oracle")
 Mary Crawford and Alan Templeton - King ("Stolen Voices")
 Ramelle Mair, David Acer, and Barry Julien - Mystery Hunters ("Anastasia, Anna Anderson")
 Jordan Wheeler - renegadepress.com ("Dying to Connect")

2006
  Jordan Wheeler - renegadepress.com ("The Rez")
 Steven Westren - Dragon ("Dragon Runs the Store")
 Bob McDonald and Ken Hewitt-White - Heads Up! ("How Do We Get Around in Space?")
 Richard Elliott and Simon Racioppa - Jane and the Dragon ("A Dragon's Tail")
 Dennis Heaton - Naughty Naughty Pets ("Sock It to Me")

2007
  Sara Snow - renegadepress.com ("Blackout" aka "Getting it Right")
 Sean Cullen - Grossology ("Fartzilla")
 Gary Wheeler - Jacob Two-Two ("Jacob Two-Two and the Hockey Seat Hoopla")
 Ramelle Mair and David Acer - Mystery Hunters ("Giant Shark")
 Trevor Cameron - Wapos Bay: The Series ("Something to Remember")

2008
  Robert Pincombe, Shelley Hoffman, and Karen Moonah - Iggy Arbuckle ("There's Something About Berries/Idle Worship")
 Terry McGurrin - 6Teen ("Silent Butt Deadly")
 Bob McDonald - Heads Up! ("What Will Cars Look Like in the Future?")
 Emily Andras - Instant Star ("Like a Virgin")
 Dennis Jackson - Wapos Bay: The Series ("The Guardians")

2009
  Steven Westren - My Friend Rabbit ("Frog on a Log")
 Richard Clark - Grossology ("The New Recruits")
 Victor Nicolle, Dennis Heaton, and Sandy Flanagan - Jibber Jabber ("Night of the Werewolf/Enter the Jelly")
 Jeff Biederman - Life with Derek ("Just Friends")
 Sean Jara - The Latest Buzz ("The First Impressions Issue")

2010s

2010
  Trevor Cameron - Wapos Bay: The Series ("The Hardest Lesson")
 Sheila Dinsmore and John De Klein - Busytown Mysteries ("The Sandcastle Squasher/The Strange Ski Tracks Mystery")
 Scott Fellows - Johnny Test ("Papa Johnny/The Johnnyminster Dog Show")
 Myra Fried and Steve Wright - Majority Rules! ("Becky Takes A Pass")
 Duncan McKenzie, Jerry Schaefer, Gary Pearson, and Carolyn Taylor - That's So Weird! ("Background Music")

2011
  Simon Racioppa and Richard Elliott - Spliced ("Pink")
 Sean Cullen - Almost Naked Animals ("Better Safe than Sorry")
 Michael Grassi - Degrassi ("My Body is a Cage, Part 2")
 Anita Kapila - How to be Indie ("How to get Plugged In")
 Philippe Ivanusic-Vallee and Davila LeBlanc - League of Super Evil ("Voltina")

2012
  Frank van Keeken - Wingin' It ("Hands Solo")
 Paul Gardner - Gisèle's Big Backyard ("Movie Moments - Long 1")
 Dennis Jackson and Melanie Jackson - Wapos Bay: Long Goodbyes
 Terry McGurrin - Scaredy Squirrel ("From Rodent with Love")
 Alex McIntosh - Things You Need To Know ("Weather")

2013
  Ramona Barckert - Degrassi ("Bitter Sweet Symphony" part 2)
 Steve Westren - Almost Naked Animals ("Sun Scream")
 Lisa Hunter - Finding Stuff Out ("Solids, Liquid & Gases")
 Terry McGurrin - Scaredy Squirrel ("Safety Corner Conundrum")
 Claire Ross Dunn - Wingin' It ("Total Debate of the Heart")

2014
  Matt Huether - Degrassi ("Unbelievable")
 J. J. Johnson and Christin Simms - Dino Dan: Trek's Adventures ("Cowboys vs. Dinosaurs / Survival of the Biggest")
 Michael Markus and Tim Stubinski - If I Had Wings
 Alejandro Alcoba and Carling Tedesco - The Next Step ("Anything You Can Do, I Can Do Better")
 Phil Ivanusic-Vallée - Oh No! It's an Alien Invasion ("Unitron / Dan the Man")

2015
  Matt Huether - Degrassi ("Give Me	One Reason")
 J. J. Johnson and Christin Simms - Annedroids ("Parent Swap")
 Edward Kay - Finding Stuff Out ("Poop")
 Jesse Shamata, Evany Rosen, and Eric Toth - Gaming Show (In My Parents' Garage) ("All Night Long")
 Tim McKeon - Odd Squad ("Training Day")

2016
  Alejandro Alcoba - Degrassi: Next Class ("#YesMeansYes")
 J. J. Johnson and Christin Simms - Annedroids ("The Mother of Invention Part 2")
 Adam Barken - Bruno & Boots: Go Jump In The Pool
 Tim McKeon - Odd Squad ("The First Day")
 Ken Cuperus - The Stanley Dynamic ("The Stanley Wild Weekend")

2017
 Adam Peltzman and Tim McKeon, Odd Squad: "Drop Gadget Repeat/20 Questions"
Susan Coyne, L.M. Montgomery's Anne of Green Gables: Fire and Dew
Sarah Glinski, Degrassi: Next Class: "#IRegretNothing"
Matt Huether, Degrassi: Next Class: "#ImSleep"
Rachael Schaefer, The Next Step: "A New Regime"

2018
 Mark De Angelis and Leah Gotcsik, Odd Squad: "Where There's a Wolf, There's a Way / New Jacket Required"
Claire Cappelletti, Finding Stuff Out: "The Nose Knows"
J. J. Johnson, Christin Simms and Nathalie Younglai, Dino Dana: "A Dino Never Forgets / Claw and Order"
Penelope Laurence, Finding Stuff Out: "Noisy Bodies"
Karen McClellan, The Next Step: "Twinkle Toes"

2019
 Christin Simms, Amish Patel and J. J. Johnson, Dino Dana: "Dino Prints"
Kate Hewlett, Backstage: "Not for Sale"
Vivian Lin, Bajillionaires: "Good Whale Hunting"
Sarah Glinski, Holly Hobbie: "The Mad Muralist"
Cole Bastedo, Holly Hobbie: "The Rabble Rouser"

2020s

2020
 Jessica Meya, Detention Adventure: "Hitting a Wall"
Alejandro Alcoba, Holly Hobbie: "The Puzzled Peacemaker"
J. J. Johnson and Christin Simms, Endlings: "The End is the Beginning is the End"
Karen McClellan, The Next Step: "The Comeback Kid"
Adam Peltzman and Stephanie Kaliner, Odd Squad Mobile Unit: "Mr. Unpredictable/Down the Tubes"

2021
 Mark De Angelis and Eric Toth, Odd Squad Mobile Unit: "Mission O Possible / Nature of the Sandbeast"
John May and Suzanne Bolch, 16 Hudson: "Welcome "
Lisa Codrington, Lockdown: "The Confession"
Nicole Stamp, Lockdown: "Guilty Until Proven Innocent"
Rennata López, My Home, My Life: "Israel-My Hip Hoppin' Family"

References 

Writing children
Screenwriting awards for television